Ginataang munggo, also known as lelut balatung in pampanga or tinutungang munggo, is a Filipino glutinous rice gruel dessert with toasted mung beans, coconut milk, and sugar. It is typically flavored with vanilla or pandan leaves. Corn and fruits like jackfruit or banana may also be added. It is a type of lugaw and ginataan.

See also
Ginataang mais
Ginataan

References

Rice dishes
Philippine desserts
Philippine rice dishes
Legume dishes